Acacia Avenue is a cliché in British culture. It is a placeholder name for an unexceptional middle-class suburban street.

There are at least sixty Acacia Avenues in the United Kingdom, nine of them within Greater London.

In Canada, the residence of the Leader of the Official Opposition, Stornoway, is located on Acacia Avenue in Ottawa, Ontario.

See also
29 Acacia Avenue
The Number of the Beast (album), which features a track with the title 22 Acacia Avenue

External links
"The street where you live" - BBC News
"Lives of Acacia Avenue revealed" - BBC News
"Acacia Avenue - where they never grumble" - The Guardian

Housing in the United Kingdom
British culture